Standing in the Breach is the fourteenth studio album by American singer-songwriter Jackson Browne. It was released on October 7, 2014, by Inside Recordings and was his first album of new material in six years.

Track listing
All tracks composed by Jackson Browne except where noted. Lyrics available at Jackson Browne's website.
"The Birds of St. Marks" – 4:23
"Yeah Yeah" – 6:15
"The Long Way Around" – 6:26
"Leaving Winslow" – 3:53
"If I Could Be Anywhere" – 7:08
"You Know the Night" (words: Woody Guthrie; music: Jackson Browne, Rob Wasserman) – 5:32
"Walls and Doors" (Carlos Varela; English translation by Jackson Browne) – 6:02
"Which Side" – 6:38
"Standing in the Breach" – 5:37
"Here" – 4:26

Personnel 
 Jackson Browne – lead vocals, acoustic guitar (1, 3, 5, 6, 10), acoustic piano (2, 3, 5, 9), electric rhythm guitar (4, 8)
 Benmont Tench – acoustic piano (5), Hammond organ (5)
 Aldo López-Gavilán – acoustic piano (7)
 Jeff Young – Hammond organ (8)
 Mike Thompson – Hammond organ (9)
 Greg Leisz – 12-string electric guitar (1), electric baritone guitar (2), tenor acoustic guitar (3),  pedal steel guitar (4), lap steel guitar (6, 8, 10), acoustic guitar (9)
 Val McCallum – electric guitar (1-7, 9), harmony vocals (1, 4, 6, 8), electric baritone guitar (8)
 Carlos Varela – acoustic guitar (7), ending vocals (7)
 Mark Goldenberg – electric guitar (10)
 Bob Glaub – bass (1, 4, 8, 9)
 Taylor Goldsmith  bass (2), harmony vocals (2)
 Alex Al – bass (3)
 Tal Wilkenfeld – bass (5)
 Sebastian Steinberg – bass (6)
 Julio César González – bass (7)
 Kevin McCormick – bass (10)
 Don Heffington – drums (1, 6)
 Griffin Goldsmith – drums (2), tambourine (2), harmony vocals (2)
 David Goodstein – drum loop (3)
 Mauricio Lewak – drum fills (3), drums (4, 7, 9, 10)
 Jay Bellerose – snare drum (3), tambourine (3), cymbal (3), percussion (5, 9)
 Jim Keltner – drums (5)
 Pete Thomas – drums (8)
 Luis Conte – udu (5), tambourine (5), djembe (7), shaker (7)
 Kipp Lennon – harmony vocals (1)
 Chavonne Stewart – harmony vocals (3, 5, 8)
 Alethea Mills – harmony vocals (5, 8)
 Doug Haywood – harmony vocals (6)
 Jonathan Wilson – harmony vocals (10)

Production 
 Jackson Browne – producer 
 Paul Dieter – producer, recording, mixing 
 Bill Lane – additional engineer, recording assistant, mix assistant 
 Rich Tosi – recording assistant, mix assistant, photography 
 Ron McMaster – mastering 
 Dustin Stanton – art design 
 Recorded at Groove Masters and Apogee Studios (Santa Monica, California).
 Mastered at Capitol Mastering (Hollywood, California).

References

2014 albums
Jackson Browne albums
albums recorded at Groove Masters Studios